St Theodore (died 820) was a monk of the Eastern Orthodox Church who was known for his strong opposition to the  Byzantine Iconoclasm.

Theodore was born in Constantinople to a family with strong connections to the Eastern Orthodox Church. Ordained in 787, in 794 he became abbot of the Symboleon monastery in Bithynia, and later escaped from Saracen raids to Constantinople where he became an abbot again. He clashed with successive emperors (Constantine VI, Nicephorus I, Leo V the Armenian, and Michael II the Stammerer) on the issue of iconoclasm (then for the second time in ascendancy in the Empire but strongly opposed by St Theodore). For this he suffered imprisonment and exile: he is the author of many works in which he defends Orthodoxy. He died in exile in Bithynia in the Akrita Monastery which he had founded.

His feast days are 11 November (Catholic Church) and 27 December (Eastern Orthodox Church),

References

Sources 

 Catholic Online http://www.catholic.org/saints/saint.php?saint_id=736
 Житие и страдание святого преподобномученика и исповедника Феодора и брата его преподобного Феофана начертанных https://archive.today/20070702185949/http://www.pravoslavie.uz/Jitiya/12/27FeodorNachertanniy.htm

8th-century births
820 deaths
9th-century Byzantine people
9th-century Christian saints
Saints from Constantinople